Kendall Township may refer to the following townships in the United States:

 Kendall Township, Kendall County, Illinois
 Kendall Township, Hamilton County, Kansas
 Kendall Township, Kearny County, Kansas